Richard Allen Stuverud Jr. (born September 26, 1969) is an American drummer from Seattle, Washington. He lives in Oakland, California where he writes, arranges and produces songs. He plays drums in the Oakland based bands, REQ'D, Slow Phase and Lefav. Due to Pearl Jam drummer Matt Cameron testing positive for COVID-19, Stuverud played with Pearl Jam on several shows of the Gigaton Tour in May of 2022. He shared substitute drumming duties during these shows together with Josh Klinghoffer and Dave Krusen. 

For his debut album, Stuverud worked with lyricist, Derek McCulloch on  “Memories in Kodachrome,” released on May 1, 2020. The follow-up full length album, "Hummingbirds" was released in March, 2022.  
A 7" vinyl,  "Not Afraid/Put your Guns Down" written by Stuverud in response to the Paris attacks and against gun violence was produced by Pearl Jam's  Jeff Ament and released by Monkey Wrench Records in 2017.

Known for playing in several bands in the Seattle scene, his first was the punk rock band The Fastbacks. Through the mid-90s, Stuverud played in the bands Three Fish and Tres Mts., both side projects of Pearl Jam bassist Jeff Ament. Three Fish released the albums Three Fish (1996) and The Quiet Table (1999), through Epic Records. The album Tres Mts. (Three Mountains), with Doug Pinnick of King's X and guest guitarist Mike McCready, was released in 2011. Pearl Jam's 2011 box set, Vitalogy, includes the previously-unreleased demo version of  "Nothingman" with Stuverud on drums.

In 2012, he worked again with Jeff Ament, this time with NYC singer-songwriter, Joseph Arthur, to form the band, RNDM. They released their debut album, Acts (2012) and followed up with Ghost Riding (2016). Stuverud has collaborated with Ament on his solo albums, including I Should be Outside(2020), Tone (2008) and While my Heart Beats (2012). Stuverud is also on drums for Ament's third solo album, Heaven/Hell(2018).

A member of the Seattle band War Babies, he also played in Suicide Squad, the side project of the Brad Sinsel of TKO and for a short time in the power metal band, Fifth Angel, appearing in the 1989 video for the song, "Time Will Tell." He played in several other bands in Seattle, including the cover band, Luv. Co (with Mother Love Bone and War Babies members), and Blind Horse, which featured Bruce Fairweather, ex-guitarist of Mother Love Bone and bass player in Love Battery. He later joined the Portland band, Pilot, and released the album, Stranger's Waltz, in 1998.

Stuverud has recorded and toured internationally with South African artist, Robbi Robb in Tribe After Tribe, Nash Kato of Urge Overkill, U.K. artists, Paul Newsome and Proud Mary, and the NYC band, White Light Motorcade. His versatility on drums landed him national tours with Chicago Blues man, Barkin' Bill Smith as well as Nashville's Gary Allan. Stuverud also continued to collaborate with Robbi Robb, contributing to the Tribe After Tribe albums, M.O.A.B. (2007) and Pearls Before Swine (1997) as well as Robb's 3rd Ear Experience albums, Stoned Gold (2017) and Stones of a Feather (2016).

Discography
Singles
Richard Stuverud, This Big Love, 2021
Richard Stuverud, Empty Branches, 2021
Richard Stuverud, Nobody's Perfect, 2021
Richard Stuverud, Whole Wide World, 2021
Richard Stuverud, I'mSorryPleaseForgiveMeILoveyouThankYou, 2020
Richard Stuverud, Stargazers, 2020
Richard Stuverud, Not Afraid/Put your Guns Down, Monkey Wrench Records, 2017
RNDM, Modern Times, Monkey Wrench Records, 2012

Albums
Richard Stuverud, Hummingbirds, 2022
Richard Stuverud, Memories in Kodachrome, 2020
REQ'D, Pulling Up Floorboards, WonderTaker, 2020
Slow Phase, Fuzzy Mind Records, 2020
REQ'D, Fall in Love on Hate Street, WonderTaker, 2019
Jeff Ament, Heaven/Hell, Monkey Wrench Records, 2018
3rd Ear Experience, Stoned Gold, 2017
RNDM, Ghost Riding, Dine Alone Records, 2016
3rd Ear Experience, Stones of a Feather, 2016
RNDM, Acts, Monkey Wrench Records, 2012
Jeff Ament, While My Heart Still Beats, Monkey Wrench Records 2012
Tres Mts, Tres Mts, Monkey Wrench Records, 2011
The Richards, Dark Stuff Blues, Joshua Tree Records 2010
Proud Mary, Dust and Diamonds, i-tunes release 2009
Jeff Ament, Tone, Ten Club Records, 2009
Tribe after Tribe, m.o.a.b., Rodeostar Records 2008
Paul Newsome, Electric & Palms, i-tunes release, 2008
White Light Motorcade, Take Me to your Party, FabTone Records, 2004
The Trouble with Sweeney, I Know you Destroy, BT Records, 2003
Nash Kato, Debutante, Loose Groove Records, 2000
Three Fish, Quite Table, Epic Records, 1999
The Returnables, The Returnables, indie release, 1999
Tribe after Tribe, Pearls before Swine, Intercord Records, 1997
Three Fish, Three Fish, Epic Records, 1997
Pilot, Stranger's Waltz, Mercury Records, 1997
Pilot, When the Day has Broken, TK Records, 1996
Lazy Susan, Sink, Warner Chapel Music, 1995
War Babies, War Babies, Columbia Records, 1992
Suicide Squad, Suicide Squad, Music for Nations, 1987 
The Fastbacks, ...and his Orchestra, PopLlama Records, 1987
The Bombardiers, Fight Back, Green Monkey Records, 1985
The Bombardiers, Search and Enjoy, Option to Burn, 1984

EPs
The Fastbacks, Everyday is Saturday, No Threes, 1985
The Fastbacks, Fastbacks Play Five of Their Favorites, No Threes, 1983

References

External links

Interview on SIRIUS Radio
Interview on Billboard Magazine
Interview on Red Velvet Media

Living people
Musicians from Washington (state)
American rock drummers
Alternative metal musicians
American alternative rock drummers
Grunge musicians
20th-century American drummers
American male drummers
RNDM members
20th-century American male musicians
1969 births